Acaulona is a genus of flies in the family Tachinidae, comprising three species.

Species
Acaulona costata Wulp, 1888 – Mexico to Argentina
Acaulona erythropyga Sabrosky, 1950 – Puerto Rico
Acaulona peruviana Townsend, 1913 – Peru

References

Tachinidae
Diptera of South America
Taxa named by Frederik Maurits van der Wulp